Jean Baptiste Ferdinand Monchablon, known as Jan Monchablon (6 September 1854, Châtillon-sur-Saône - 2 October 1904, Châtillon-sur-Saône) was a French landscape painter.

Biography 

His father was an official with the local health department. He began his education at the Collège Notre-Dame in Nantes. In 1875, after working as a private tutor, he became a Professor in Quimper. Six years later, he entered the École des Beaux-Arts, where he studied under Jean-Paul Laurens. From 1883 to 1884, he took further lessons in the studio of Alexandre Cabanel. Finding himself attracted to the works of the Flemish masters, he took a study trip to the Netherlands in 1886. It was at that time he began signing his name "Jan", instead of "Jean".

Upon his return, he married Fanny Julien, a pianist he had met while studying at the École, and they decided to settle in his hometown, leasing property there and planting a small vineyard to help defray expenses. Despite his relatively isolated location, he continued to exhibit regularly at the Salon and won several medals there as well as at the Exposition Universelle (1900).

He was admitted to the Legion d'honneur in 1895. His friend Roland Knoedler (an American art dealer), commissioned Antoine Bourdelle to create a monument in his honor. Unfortunately, it was destroyed during World War II. A replacement was later created by the sculptor Marcel Joosen (born 1943).

Many of his paintings are in small museums in the United States, including the Haggin Museum in Stockton, California.

References

External links

 Arcadja Auctions: More works by Monchablon
 Jan Monchablon's works at the Haggin Museum

1854 births
1904 deaths
Landscape painters
19th-century French painters
French male painters
People from Vosges (department)
19th-century French male artists